Y Carinae (Y Car) is a Classical Cepheid variable, a type of variable star, in the constellation Carina. Its apparent magnitude varies from 7.53 to 8.48.

The primary Cepheid pulsation period is 3.6 days, but it also pulsates with a secondary period of 2.56 days.  It is known as a double-mode Cepheid, or a beat Cepheid since the two periods interfere to produce slow variations at a beat frequency.

The variable primary star is in a triple system with a very close pair of hot main sequence stars.  The period of the outer pair is 2.76 years.  The inner pair are constrained to orbit in less than 31 days, but the exact nature of the orbit is unknown.  The existence of the close binary pair throws into doubt previous calculations of the mass of the pulsating star.  The existence of high numbers of triple systems and short period Cepheids suggests that some at least of the short period Cepheids may have formed by mergers.

References

Carina (constellation)
F-type giants
Carinae, Y
091595
Classical Cepheid variables
051653
Durchmusterung objects
J10331084-5829550
Triple star systems